State-population monotonicity is a property of apportionment methods, which are methods of allocating seats in a parliament among federal states. The property says that, if the population of a state increases faster than that of other states, then it should not lose a seat. An apportionment method that fails to satisfy this property is said to have a population paradox.

In the apportionment literature, this property is simply called population monotonicity.  However, the term "population monotonicity" is more commonly used to denote a very different property of resource-allocation rules:

 In resource allocation, the property relates to the set of agents participating in the division process. A population-increase means that the previously-present agents are entitled to fewer items, as there are more mouths to feed. See population monotonicity for more information.
 In apportionment, the property relates to the population of an individual state, which determines the state's entitlement. A population-increase means that a state is entitled to more seats. The parallel property in fair division is called weight monotonicity: when the "weight" (- entitlement) of an agent increases, his utility should not decrease.

There are several variants of the state-population monotonicity (PM); see mathematics of apportionment for definitions and notation.

Erlang PM 
The simplest definition of PM is that, if the population of one state  increases and the populations of the other states remain the same (such that the entitlement of  increases and the entitlements of the other states decrease), then the apportionment of  weakly increases. This notion was proposed by Agner Krarup Erlang in 1907 and studied by Aanund Hylland in 1978.

The problem with this notion is that, in practice, populations of states do not remain the same, they increase simultaneously.

Strong PM 
A stronger variant of PM requires that, if the entitlement of state  increases (that is: its population divided by the sum of all populations), then the apportionment of  weakly increases. This variant is too strong: whenever there are at least 3 states, and the number of seats is not exactly equal to the number of states, no partial apportionment method (= apportionment method for a fixed number of states and seats) is strongly-PM. Proof: Suppose by contradiction that the partial apportionment  is strongly-PM. Consider several cases:

  - there is only one seat. Consider two entitlement vectors:
Then by symmetry,  must return all  apportionments in which some state  receives 1 and the others receive 0.
Then by strong PM both must receive at least 1 seat, but this is impossible.
  - there are fewer seats than states. Consider three entitlement vectors:
Then by strong PM and symmetry the first  states must receive at least  seats in any apportionment. This requires at least  seats. This is impossible if . Even if , it is possible only if . This means that any state with entitlement less than   must get at most 1 seat, and any state with entitlement less than  must get 0 seats.
Then, the apportionment of state 1 must be  and of the other states 0. But then the sum of apportionments is smaller than the number of seats - a contradiction.
  - the usual situation - there are more seats than states.

Population-pair monotonicity 
If the ratio between the entitlements of two states  increases, then state   should not receive less seats while state   receives more seats. This property is also called vote-ratio monotonicity; see that page for more information.

Voter monotonicity 
Voter monotonicity is a property weaker than pairwise-PM. It says that, if party i attracts more voters, while all other parties keep the same number of voters, then party i must not lose a seat. Failure of voter monotonicity is called the no-show paradox, since a voter can help their party by not voting. The largest-remainder method with the Droop quota fails voter monotonicity.

Weak population-monotonicity ("concordance") 
Weak population-monotonicity, also called concordance, is a static property: it says that a state with a larger population should not receive a smaller allocation. Formally, if  then . 

All known apportionment methods are concordant. In particular, both Highest averages methods and Largest remainder methods are concordant.

There is a fine point with some divisor methods in which the divisor sequence starts with 0. Therefore, if there are fewer items than agents, then the Adams method is, theoretically, allowed to allocate the objects arbitrarily, even giving more items to agents with smaller entitlements, which contradicts concordance. In practice, this seldom happens, as the number of items is usually larger than the number of agents. Formally, Adams' method is usually defined such that it returns an empty set whenever the number of items is smaller than the number of agents.

References 

Apportionment method criteria